Chuck Coles (also known as Chuut Coles) (born 20 March 1980 in Oshawa, Ontario) is a Canadian musician. He was the guitarist for heavy metal band Brown Brigade and the lead singer, guitarist, and "band leader" for the band The Organ Thieves.

Before joining Brown Brigade, Coles was a member of Canadian pop punk band Cauterize from 2005 to when it disbanded in 2007; he played his last show with Cauterize on 19 October 2007 while already a member of Brown Brigade. With Cauterize, he played on the albums Paper Wings (2005), and Disguises (2007) with its added acoustic EP Unmasked. Coles's addition to the band as lead guitarist provided for stronger three-guitar melodies on Disguises, particularly on the re-release of Closer. Prior to joining Cauterize, he played in local punk, hip-hop, reggae band Murder Culture.

Coles formed the southern/hard rock band The Organ Thieves with Brown Brigade band-member Dave Baksh and former Cauterize band-member Matt Worobec. Coles sings lead vocals, plays lead guitar, and writes most of the lyrics and guitar melodies for the band. The Organ Thieves released their first EP, God's Favorite Sons, in March 2009.

In 2013, Coles has joined Burlington, Ontario based punk/psychobilly band The Creepshow as lead guitarist.

In 2017, Coles did a small southern Ontario solo tour opening for Against Me!. Currently he fronts his own solo act – Chuck Coles and the United Snakes.

References

External links 
 Chuck Coles's MySpace page
 Organ Thieves web site

1981 births
Brown Brigade members
Canadian heavy metal guitarists
Canadian male guitarists
Canadian punk rock guitarists
Living people
Musicians from Oshawa
21st-century Canadian guitarists
21st-century Canadian male musicians